The St. Louis Gunners were an independent professional football team based in St. Louis, Missouri, that played the last three games of the 1934 National Football League season, replacing the Cincinnati Reds on the league schedule after the Reds' league membership was suspended. They won their first game against the Pittsburgh Pirates (now Steelers) 6–0, and lost the last two to the Detroit Lions (40–7) and the Green Bay Packers (21–14).  Six of the Reds players joined the team for the last two games. The team was headquartered at the St. Louis National Guard Armory, which accounts for its nickname the 'Gunners'.

History

Origins
In 1931, the 128th Field Artillery of the Missouri National Guard, announced through its spokesman that it would sponsor a team for the upcoming football season. The club was originally called the Battery A Gunners from its association with the Guard. Future Hall-of-Famer Jimmy Conzelman, was named the team's first head coach. Bud Yates was named the team's general manager.

1931–1933
The Gunners posted a 5–2–1 record in 1931.  However, they lost to the NFL's Chicago Cardinals, 26–6. After the game, Cardinals captain, Ernie Nevers, called the Gunners the "best independent club we have ever faced." A game against a second NFL team, the New York Giants, was scheduled and later canceled that season, to avoid conflict with another game involving a team of Notre Dame All-Stars.

For the team's second season, Bullet Baker was named the team's new coach. While most of the core of the team was kept intact, the Gunners brought in Dick Thornton and Mack Gladden from the University of Missouri. Meanwhile, Yates left the team for the season, for a position with the cross-town St. Louis Veterans. The 1932 Gunners posted a 7–4–1 record. The team was able to play its rival, the Memphis Tigers,  to a standoff in three games, St. Louis winning 6–0, Memphis winning 12–0, and the third game ending in a scoreless tie. Later that year, the Tigers, Gunners and the Oklahoma City Chiefs each laid some claim to a mythical "independent championship,". Two of the team's losses that season came against NFL caliber opponents, the Cardinals, 20–7, and the Portsmouth Spartans, 12–0.

By 1933, the team had been renamed the "St. Louis Gunners". Most of the ties the team had with the National Guard had been severed. For example,  the players were no longer required to stay at the Battery A barracks, as they had in the past. Dick Frahm, Babe Lyon, and Charley Malone were signed from the Washington Redskins. The team posted an 11–2–3 record in 1933. That year it managed to defeat many of the NFL teams it faced. The Gunners defeated the NFL's Brooklyn Dodgers 21–2, and the Chicago Cardinals 28–7. The team also held the Chicago Bears to a scoreless tie. The team's only two NFL losses of the year came against the Green Bay Packers and the Cincinnati Reds. The team had also managed to outscore its opponents 297–72.

Entry into the NFL
On August 8, 1934, before the start of the NFL season, St. Louis purchased the NFL's Cincinnati Reds for $20,000. However, the Gunners needed the other league owners to approve the sale. Only then would the Gunners would be official members. On August 17, the other owners decided to reject the Gunners bid to buy the Reds, probably because St. Louis was considered to be too remote from the rest of the clubs, most of which were in the Northeast, and yearly trips there would have increased travel expenses. Meanwhile, the Gunners declined membership in the minor league American Football League. As a result, the new league decided to form the St. Louis Blues. Gunners GM Bud Yates was credited with founding the team. The Blues lured Dick Frahm away from the Gunners and even took over the lease of Public Schools Stadium. As a result, the Gunners moved their home games to Sportsman's Park. Meanwhile, Chile Walsh became the team's fourth head coach in four years.

The Gunners started their 1934 season, 5–0 against several semi-pro teams. The team was searching desperately for decent teams to compete against. However, on November 6, 1934, the NFL finally approved the sale of the Cincinnati Reds to St. Louis for $20,000 – $30,000. The Gunners were now officially members of the NFL and were invited to play the Reds last 3 games of the 1934 NFL season.  The Blues then moved to Kansas City two days later in order to avoid fighting the Gunners for control of the St. Louis fan base.

1934 NFL season
The Gunners defeated their first NFL opponent, the Pittsburgh Pirates, 6–0. However, a week later they were defeated by the Detroit Lions 40–7. The team managed to defeat the Pirates again in a 10–0 rematch, but the game, scheduled while the Gunners were still playing independently, was subsequently ruled an exhibition. The Gunners lost to the Packers a week later, 21–14, before dropping another close game to the Dodgers 17–14. The Gunners ended their 1934 season with a 7–0 win over the Kansas City Blues.

The team then moved to the rival American Football League where it folded after a season.

Season results

References

 
American football teams established in 1931
Sports clubs disestablished in 1940
Defunct National Football League teams
Gunners
1931 establishments in Missouri
1940 disestablishments in Missouri